The Damon House is a historic house in Arlington, Massachusetts.  Although traditionally associated with the Rev. David Damon of the First Parish Church, this -story wood-frame house was probably built c. 1855, after Damon's death, by one of his descendants.  It is five bays wide, with a side gable roof, and is predominantly Greek Revival in its styling.  In 1875 it underwent some alteration, adding the Italianate front portico and small side additions.  The house remained in Damon family hands into the 1940s.

The house was listed on the National Register of Historic Places in 1985.

See also
National Register of Historic Places listings in Arlington, Massachusetts

References

Houses on the National Register of Historic Places in Arlington, Massachusetts
Houses completed in 1850
Houses in Arlington, Massachusetts
Greek Revival architecture in Massachusetts